Trapania lineata is a species of sea slug, a dorid nudibranch, a marine gastropod mollusc in the family Goniodorididae.

Distribution
This species was first described from Villefranche-sur-Mer in the Mediterranean Sea. It is found from Antalya, Turkey to Spain.

Description
The length of the body attains 15 mm. This goniodorid nudibranch is translucent white in colour, with a pattern of opaque white lines on the body and running into the lateral papillae. The oral tentacles, rhinophores, gills and lateral processes are tipped with yellow-orange pigment. There is a narrow white stripe along the tail which becomes an orange tip.

Ecology
Trapania lineata feeds on Entoprocta which often grow on sponges.

References

External links
 

Goniodorididae
Gastropods described in 1960